Heine is both a surname and a given name of German origin. People with that name include:

People with the surname
 Albert Heine (1867–1949), German actor
 Alice Heine (1858–1925), American-born princess of Monaco
 Armand Heine (1818–1883), French banker and philanthropist
 Ben Heine (born 1983), Belgian visual artist and music producer
 Bernd Heine (born 1939), German linguist and Afrikanist
 Bernhard Heine (1800–1846), German physician and bone specialist 
 Bill Heine (1945–2019), British radio presenter
 Bud Heine (1900–1976), American baseball player
 Cariba Heine (born 1988), Australian actress
 Carl Wilhelm Heine (1838–1877), German surgeon
 Charles Heiné (1920–1971), French footballer
 Eduard Heine (1821–1881), German mathematician
 Edmund Carl Heine, German convicted of espionage in 1941
Ellen Heine (1907–1989), botanist, photographer and painter
 Ferdinand Heine (1809–1894), German ornithologist and collector
 Ferdinand Heine (junior) (1840–1920), German plant breeder and ornithologist
 Friedrich Wilhelm Heine (1845–1921), German painter
 Gustav Heine von Geldern (1812–1886), Austrian publicist
 Gustav Otto Ludolf Heine (1868–1959), German-American piano business owner and automobile builder
 Harry Heine (1928–2004), Canadian maritime and landscape painter
 Heinrich Heine (1797–1856), German poet
 Helme Heine (born 1941), German children's book author
 Hilda Heine (born 1951), Marshallese educator and politician, President of the Marshall Islands
 Jared Heine (born 1984), Marshallese swimmer
 Joseph Heine (1803–1877), German physician and civil servant
 Jakob Heine (1800–1879), German orthopaedist
 Johann Georg Heine (1771–1838), German orthopaedist and doctor
 Jutta Heine (born 1940), German athlete
 Karl Heine (1819–1888), German lawyer and entrepreneur
 Karsten Heine (born 1955), German football player and manager
 Klaus Heine, German marketing lecturer
 Leina'ala Kalama Heine (died 2015), American kumu hula and hula instructor
 Max Heine (1911–1988), American investor and fund manager
 Maximilian Meyer Heine (1807–1879), German doctor and Russian state councilor
 Michel Heine (1819–1890), French banker and businessman
 Pete Heine (born 1928), American politician
 Peter Heine (1928–2005), South African cricketer
 Robert von Heine-Geldern (1885–1968), Austrian ethnologist, historian, and archaeologist
 Salomon Heine (1767–1844), German merchant and banker
 Sara Heine (1858–1953), Russian-born Jewish actress
 Steven Heine (born 1950), American professor of religion and history
 Steven Heine (psychologist), Canadian professor 
 Thomas Heine, Marshallese politician and government minister
 Thomas Theodor Heine (1867–1948), German painter and illustrator
 Veronika Heine (born 1986) Austrian table tennis player
 Vita Heine (born 1984), Latvian-Norwegian racing cyclist
 Volker Heine (born 1930), New Zealand-British physicist
 Werner Heine (born 1935), German football player
 Wilbur Heine, Marshallese politician and government minister
 Wilhelm Heine (1827–1885), American painter and soldier
 William C. Heine (1911–1991), Canadian author and newspaper editor
 Wolfgang Heine (1861–1944), German jurist
 Yosef Heine, Israeli football player, active 1954–1964

People with the given name
 Heine Araújo (born 1984), Brazilian artistic gymnast
 Heinie Beau (1911–1987), American jazz composer and musician 
 Heine Fernandez (born 1966), Danish football player
 Heine Havreki (1514–1576), Norwegian Lutheran pastor
 Heine Jensen (born 1977), Danish handball coach
 Heine Kanimea, Nauruan basketball player
 Heine Meine (1896–1968), American baseball player
 Heine Strathmann, German sprint canoeist, active in the late 1930s
 Heine Totland (born 1970), Norwegian singer
 Heine Wang (born 1963), Norwegian businessperson
 Herman Heine Goldstine (1913–2004), American mathematician and computer scientist
 Peter Heine Nielsen (born 1973), Danish chess player
 Veitel-Heine Ephraim (1703–1775), jeweller to the Prussian Court

Fictional
 Heine Rammsteiner, protagonist in the Dogs: Bullets & Carnage manga
 Heine Westenfluss, a character in the anime television series Mobile Suit Gundam SEED
 Heine Wittgenstein, protagonist of the manga The Royal Tutor

See also 
 
 Hein, a surname (including a list of people with the name)
 Heini, a given name and a surname (including a list of people with the name)
 Heyne, a surname (including a list of people with the name)
 Heines, a surname
 Hines (name), a name
 Hynes, a surname
 Heinie (disambiguation)

Surnames of German origin
German-language surnames
German masculine given names
German given names
Danish masculine given names
Norwegian masculine given names
Surnames from given names